Kenneth Gene Shelley (born October 4, 1951) is an American figure skater who competed in both singles and pairs. As a single skater, he won the 1972 United States Figure Skating Championships and placed 4th at the 1972 Winter Olympics. His highest placement at the World Figure Skating Championships was a single skater was 7th, in 1972. As a pair skater, he competed with JoJo Starbuck, with whom he is a three-time National Champion. Starbuck and Shelley competed in two Olympic Games, placing 13th in 1968 and 4th in 1972, and won two bronze medals at the World Figure Skating Championships. When they made the 1968 Olympic team, they were the youngest athletes the United States had ever sent to the Olympics.

Shelley was from Downey, California.  He was first paired with Starbuck for a show in 1959, when they were very small children.  They started training seriously with coach John Nicks at the Arctic Blades FSC in 1961.  In their first year of senior competitions, when they were both 16 years old, they qualified to compete at the 1968 Winter Olympics.  Both Starbuck and Shelley attended Downey High School, where they performed off-ice lifts with the cheerleading squad and Long Beach State College.

In the summer of 1969, Shelley had a serious off-ice accident, crashing through a glass patio door at a party.  He had surgery to repair two severed tendons and spent 5 weeks in a cast.

After retiring from competitive skating, Starbuck and Shelley skated in the Ice Capades and competed professionally. Shelley was inducted into the U.S. Figure Skating Hall of Fame in 1994.

Results

Men's singles

Pairs
(with JoJo Starbuck)

References

 Pairs on Ice profile
 Skatabase: 1960s Olympics Pairs
 Skatabase: 1970s Olympic Pairs
 Skatabase: 1970s Olympics Men
 Skatabase: 1970s Worlds Pairs
 Skatabase: 1970s Worlds Men

Navigation

American male pair skaters
American male single skaters
Figure skaters at the 1968 Winter Olympics
Figure skaters at the 1972 Winter Olympics
Olympic figure skaters of the United States
Living people
1951 births
World Figure Skating Championships medalists
Sportspeople from Downey, California
20th-century American people
21st-century American people